Pratul Joshi (born 27 November 1994) is an Indian male badminton player.

Achievements

BWF International Challenge/Series
Men's Singles

 BWF International Challenge tournament
 BWF International Series tournament
 BWF Future Series tournament

References

External links
 

Living people
1994 births
Indian male badminton players